José Ernesto Galván (born 26 March 1981) is an Argentine former professional footballer. Galván spent the 2003 season with Major League Soccer club MetroStars, on loan from Boca Juniors.

External links
 José Galván at BDFA.com.ar 
 Player profile at MetroFanatic.com

1981 births
Living people
Sportspeople from Buenos Aires Province
Argentine footballers
Boca Juniors footballers
New York Red Bulls players
Cobresal footballers
Chacarita Juniors footballers
Universitario de Sucre footballers
Coquimbo Unido footballers
Expatriate footballers in Bolivia
Expatriate footballers in Chile
Expatriate footballers in Ecuador
Expatriate footballers in Peru
Major League Soccer players
Association football midfielders